Jelena Genčić (9 October 1936 – 1 June 2013) was a Serbian tennis and handball player and coach. 

In the 1970s she became a junior tennis coach and was later credited for playing a major role in the early development of numerous future top class professional players and Grand Slam champions. Among the players she discovered and coached are Monica Seles, Novak Djokovic, Goran Ivanišević, Mima Jaušovec, Iva Majoli, and Tatjana Ječmenica. Genčić-coached players went on to collect 34 Grand Slam single titles: Djokovic 22, Seles 9, Ivanišević 1, Jaušovec 1, and Majoli 1.

Early life and education
Born as one of seven children to Serbian father Jovan and Austrian mother Hermina, Jelena came from the prominent Genčić family in Serbia. Her grandfather Lazar Genčić studied medicine in Vienna, becoming one of Serbia's first surgeons in addition to setting up and running a military hospital while simultaneously holding the rank of a Royal Serbian Army general in World War I's Serbian campaign. Her great uncle Đorđe Genčić was the interior minister in the cabinet of Nikola Pašić and one of the chief conspirators of the May Coup.

She graduated with a degree in art history from the University of Belgrade's Faculty of Philosophy. She later obtained a second degree in psychology.

Career

Sports
Genčić was a handball and tennis player, playing the two sports in parallel. She began pursuing tennis in 1948 at the age of eleven. In 1954, the seventeen-year-old competed at the Wimbledon in girls' singles.

Meanwhile, in handball, Genčić played the goalkeeper position at ŽRK Crvena zvezda in both outdoor and indoor versions of the sport. She further made the Yugoslav women's national team, representing the country at the 1956 World Outdoor Handball Championship in West Germany and winning bronze at the inaugural 1957 World Championships held at home in Belgrade. 

In 1963, at the age of twenty-seven, she quit handball, devoting herself fully to tennis. In addition to being a member of Partizan tennis club, Genčić competed at various tournaments around the globe.

Media
Genčić worked as television director at the state-owned television network TV Belgrade. Her work on television rarely overlapped with sports as she was mostly involved with producing arts-and-culture programmes dealing with the history of art in Serbia, classical music, and theater.

Tennis administration and coaching
In 1968, as tennis went professional with the beginning of its open era, thirty-one-year-old Genčić, still very much an active player, began to be groomed for an eventual full-time tennis administrative career with a board position given to her at Partizan tennis club.

Though already coaching on an informal basis, in 1976, after retiring from active play, Genčić became a tennis coach. Over the following 30 years she played a part in discovering and coaching Novak Djokovic, Monica Seles, Goran Ivanišević, Mima Jaušovec, Iva Majoli, and Tatjana Ječmenica.
Jelena Genčić was also great personal development coach. Her teachings about visualizing the results in sports had a great impact on Novak Djokovic tennis career.

References

Sources

External links
Jelena Gencic and Novak Djokovic on YouTube
U ogledalu vremena: Jelena Genčić

1936 births
2013 deaths
Sportspeople from Belgrade
Serbian female handball players
Serbian female tennis players
Serbian tennis coaches
Serbian people of Austrian descent
University of Belgrade Faculty of Philosophy alumni
Novak Djokovic coaches
Yugoslav female tennis players